Anjum Mumtaz Baig is an Indian beauty queen, the winner of Femina Miss India 1968. She came from a conservative Muslim family from Hyderabad, India. She married and moved to the United States.

References 

Femina Miss India winners
Living people
Female models from Hyderabad, India
1954 births
Miss Universe 1968 contestants